Monroe County may refer to seventeen counties in the United States, all named for James Monroe:

Monroe County, Alabama 
Monroe County, Arkansas 
Monroe County, Florida 
Monroe County, Georgia 
Monroe County, Illinois 
Monroe County, Indiana 
Monroe County, Iowa 
Monroe County, Kentucky 
Monroe County, Michigan 
Monroe County, Mississippi 
Monroe County, Missouri 
Monroe County, New York 
Monroe County, Ohio 
Monroe County, Pennsylvania 
Monroe County, Tennessee
Monroe County, West Virginia, originally Monroe County, Virginia (1799–1863)
Monroe County, Wisconsin

See also
Monroe County Courthouse (disambiguation)